The Women's 5 kilometre cross-country skiing event was part of the cross-country skiing programme at the 1994 Winter Olympics, in Lillehammer, Norway. It was the ninth appearance of the event. The competition was held on 15 February 1994, at the Birkebeineren Ski Stadium.

Results

References

Women's cross-country skiing at the 1994 Winter Olympics
Women's 5 kilometre cross-country skiing at the Winter Olympics
Olymp
Cross